A compound of six cubes has two forms. One form is a symmetric arrangement of six cubes, considered as square prisms. It is a special case of the compound of six cubes with rotational freedom.

Another form is not related to a compound of six cubes with rotational freedom.

See also
Compound of three cubes
Compound of five cubes
Compound of four cubes
Compound of six octahedra

References 

Polyhedral compounds